Robert Lewis Teague (January 2, 1929 – March 28, 2013) was an African-American college football star and television news reporter.

Teague played college football at the University of Wisconsin–Madison. While a journalist with The New York Times, in May 1961, Teague (as Robert Teague) appeared as an impostor on the night-time version of TO TELL THE TRUTH, round 1. Airing May 22, 1961, Teague was able to fool the panel by getting a majority of the votes while pretending to be Sergeant George Harris, an Air Force Judo instructor. Round 2 featured fellow journalist associated with the Times, Marianne Means, as the featured contestant along with two impostors.

He started at WNBC-TV in New York City in 1963 and became one of the city's first black television journalists and went on to work as a reporter, anchorman, and producer for more than three decades. He retired from WNBC-TV in 1991.

He wrote two books. "Live and Off-Color: News Biz (1982, A&W Publishers) is an autobiography. "The Flip Side of Soul: Letters to My Son" (1989, William Morrow & Co.) is a series of reflections.

References

1929 births
2013 deaths
Sportspeople from Milwaukee
NBC News people
Wisconsin Badgers football players
American television journalists
American male journalists
20th-century American journalists
Players of American football from Milwaukee